Kathleen Jones (born 1946) is an English poet and biographer.

Biography
Born and brought up on a hill farm in the north of England, she moved to London as a teenager in order to become a writer. She spent several years in Africa and the Middle East - where she worked in English broadcasting - before returning home. She read law and then English Literature as a mature student at university before specialising in early women writers - work that culminated in A Glorious Fame, the life of Margaret Cavendish, Duchess of Newcastle.

Her published work includes radio journalism, articles for magazines and newspapers, short fiction and seventeen books - a mixture of  biography, fiction, general non-fiction and five poetry collections. Her biography of Katherine Mansfield called The Storyteller, was published in New Zealand in August 2010 by Penguin and in the UK in December 2010 by Edinburgh University Press. It includes an account of Mansfield's relationship with John Middleton Murry, his work as editor of Mansfield's unpublished manuscripts, letters and notebooks after her death, and how this adversely affected his own life. In 2013 she published a biography of Norman Nicholson - The Whispering Poet - with The Book Mill Press, and more recently, 'Travelling to the Edge of the World', an account of her journey through British Columbia to Haida Gwaii, looking at environmental issues. 

Jones has published poetry, feature articles and short fiction in a variety of national and international magazines and newspapers. Her short stories have been anthologised and broadcast on  Radio 4 and on radio networks in the Netherlands, Germany and Spain. She has also written three novels, The Sun's Companion (2013) and The Centauress (2015) and Mussolini's Hat (2018).

A prize-winning collection of poetry, Unwritten Lives, was published by Redbeck Press in 1995 and a further collection Secret Eden was exhibited as part of a collaborative project for Visual Arts Year 97 with landscape photographer Tony Riley. Her collection Not Saying Goodbye at Gate 21, published by Templar Poetry, was joint winner of the Straid Collection Award 2011. Since then she has published a new pamphlet 'Mapping Emily', with Templar, a collection 'The Rainmaker's Wife' with Indigo Dreams Publishing, and 'Hunger' with Maytree Press. 

Jones is a regular performer at Literature Festivals all over Britain and leads creative writing workshops for fiction, poetry and life writing. She is also a tutor for the Open University's creative writing program and currently a  Royal Literary Fund Fellow. She currently lives in the English Lake District close to where she was brought up Cumbria.

Works

Biography
 A Glorious Fame, Bloomsbury, 1988. (Biography of  Margaret Cavendish).
 Learning not to be First. Windrush, 1990; OUP, 1991; Goldmann (Germany) 1996. (Biography of  Christina Rossetti).
 A Passionate Sisterhood. Constable, 1997; Virago 1998. (Lives of the Wives, Sisters and Daughters of  Wordsworth,  Coleridge  and  Southey).
 Catherine Cookson: The Biography. Constable, 1999; Little Brown, 2000; Random House Australia 2000.
 Seeking Catherine Cookson’s Da, A genealogical quest. Constable Robinson, 2004.
 An Introduction to  Margaret Forster. Northern Lights, 2003.  .
 Katherine Mansfield: The Story-Teller, Penguin NZ, 2010; Edinburgh University Press, 2011. A life of Katherine Mansfield and her husband John Middleton Murry.
 A Passionate Sisterhood. Amazon Kindle The Book Mill2011 
 Christina Rossetti: Learning Not To Be First Amazon Kindle The Book Mill 2011 
 Margaret Cavendish: A glorious Fame  The Book Mill 2012 
 Margaret Forster: A Life in Books The Book Mill 2012  
 Norman Nicholson: The Whispering Poet The Book Mill 2013

Other non-fiction

as Kate Gordon:-
 A Practical Guide to Alternative Weddings, Constable, 1998; reprint, 2002. 
 A Practical Guide to Alternative Baptism and Baby-naming, Constable, 1998
 A Practical Guide to Alternative Funerals, Constable, 1998.

Poetry
 Invisible Lipstick. Stone Edge Press, 1986.
 Rumours of Another Sky. Stone Edge Press, 1987
 Unwritten Lives. Redbeck Press, 1995. 
 Other Poetry, 2001.
 Not Saying Goodbye at Gate 21 Templar Poetry 
 Mapping Emily 
 The Rainmaker's Wife 
 Hunger

Fiction
The Centauress The Book Mill 2012  
The Sun's Companion The Book Mill 2014  
Mussolini's Hat The Book Mill 2018

Short fiction
Northern Stories Vol 5 1994  Ed. Beryl Bainbridge and David Pownall  
Arc Short Stories Vol 8 1997   (Ed. Maureen Freely and Livi Michael)   
Eating Your Cake - and Having it (Anthology) 
 BBC Radio 4   Short Story slot,  1994, 1995, 1998
Tabla 1996,  1999,;  2001,.
Pitch 2001 (ed. by Susan Tranter) susantranter.co.uk
Landscape into Literature - A Writers' Anthology 2005  
Three and Other Stories Amazon Kindle The Book Mill 2011

References

External links
Authors website
A Writer's Life - Author's Blog
Twitter
Royal Literary Fund Fellows
British Council Authors website
Little Brown Published authors website
Constable Robinson
Macmillan's Authors Site
Katherine Mansfield: The Story-Teller

1946 births
Living people
English biographers
English women poets
Women biographers
English women non-fiction writers